Tom Swift and His Electric Rifle; or, Daring Adventures in Elephant Land is a young adult novel published in 1911, written by Stratemeyer Syndicate writers using the pen name Victor Appleton. It is Volume 10 in the original Tom Swift novel series published by Grosset & Dunlap. The novel is notable for inspiring the name of the Taser.

Plot 

While Tom Swift is working on his latest new invention, the electric rifle, he meets an African safari master whose stories of elephant hunting sends the group off to deepest, darkest Africa. Hunting for ivory is the least of their worries, as they find out some old friends are being held hostage by the fearsome tribes of the red pygmies.

Swift builds two major inventions in this volume. The first is a replacement airship, known as The Black Hawk. This new airship is to replace The Red Cloud, which was destroyed during his adventures in Tom Swift in the Caves of Ice. This airship is of the same general construction as The Red Cloud, but is smaller and more maneuverable.

Of foremost notice is Swift's invention of the electric rifle, a gun which fires bolts of electricity. The electric rifle can be calibrated to different levels of range, intensity and lethality; it can shoot through solid walls without leaving a hole, and is powerful enough to kill a rampaging whale, as in their steamer trek to Africa. With the electric rifle, Tom and friends bring down elephants, rhinoceroses, and buffalo, and save their lives several times in pitched battle with the red pygmies. It also can discharge a globe of light that was described as being able to maintain itself, like ball lightning, making hunting at night much safer in the dark of Africa. In appearance, the rifle looked very much like contemporary conventional rifles.

Racist content 
The Thomas Swift series included racist depictions of its non-white characters:

Homages 
Sixty years later a non-lethal weapon delivering an electric shock was developed by Jack Cover and marketed by Taser International under the name "Taser", an acronym for Thomas A. Swift's Electric Rifle. The middle initial 'A' is used to produce a word more pronounceable than "TSER", as no other name than "Tom Swift" is used for the book's hero.

2015 film 
The cinematographic adaptation rights were acquired in 2007. Tom Swift and His Electric Rifle is a documentary film (later retitled "Killing Them Safely") about TASER International, the primary manufacturer of TASER weapons for law enforcement. The film premiered on April 17, 2015 in World Competition at the Tribeca Film Festival. National USA release of the film occurred on November 27, 2015.

See also 

Pulsed energy weapon
Tom Swift
List of Tom Swift books

References

External links
 Tom Swift and his Electric Rifle e-text at Project Gutenberg

1911 American novels
Tom Swift
American young adult novels
Novels set in Africa